Mandarin Oriental, Miami is a hotel on Brickell Key in Miami, Florida, overlooking Biscayne Bay, opened in November 2000 and managed by Mandarin Oriental Hotel Group.

The hotel contains 295 guestrooms and 31 suites with balconies and terraces, restaurants and bars,  of events facilities,
and the only Forbes Travel Guide Five-Star spa in Florida.

See also
Mandarin Oriental Hotel Group
Mandarin Oriental, Hong Kong
Mandarin Oriental, Bangkok
Mandarin Oriental Hyde Park, London
Mandarin Oriental, New York

References

External links
 Mandarin Oriental, Miami

Mandarin Oriental Hotel Group
Hotels in Miami
RTKL Associates buildings
Hotel buildings completed in 2000
Hotels established in 2000
2000 establishments in Florida